Zhangjiang Tram is one of the only two tram networks operating in Shanghai today, the other being Songjiang Tram. It utilises a system manufactured by the French Translohr company. Shanghai originally had a steel wheeled electric tramway network in its urban center. Routes expanded gradually and reached largest extent in 1925 with 328 tramcars; this tram system shut down in 1975. Tram service returned to Shanghai with the opening of a rubber tired Translohr line in the suburban Zhangjiang Hi-Tech Park in 2010. It is the second rubber-tired tram system in both China and Asia, the first being TEDA tram in Tianjin.

Zhangjiang Tram started construction on December 23, 2007. Construction was originally planned to be completed in December 2008, but this was delayed a year, until December 31, 2009 when it was opened to traffic. Passenger operations started on December 31, 2009. The total investment of the Zhangjiang tram project is about 800 million yuan.

Zhangjiang tram was planned to be built in phases. The first phase is constructed and runs from Zhangjiang Hi-Tech Park Station on Shanghai Metro Line 2 (formerly Songtao Road Zuchongzhi Road Station) in the east, to Zhangdong Road Jinqiu Road Station in the west, which covers a distance of 9.8 km, with a total of 15 stops, 1 depot. Initial plans included a next phase which is an extension to Tangzhen and a third phase to Heqing Town, reaching a scale of more than 30 kilometers by 2010. Due to successive years of losses, the Zhangjiang Tram originally planned extensions are temporarily put on hold. Zhangjiang Tram has an annual loss of more than 20 million yuan. This is because the passenger flow is unbalanced during the day (many office workers are passengers during the rush hour; when commute time is over, there are very few passengers), which is generally unsatisfactory; and the maintenance cost of vehicles is extremely high, as most parts are imported. For this reason, the supply of some parts has been stopped, making the vehicle unable to operate normally.

There were also possible plans to build tram projects in Lujiazui and Sanlin areas, which also have not been materialized.

History
The new system was built in Zhangjiang Town, because it is a planned area, and commuting between neighborhoods of the town has always been difficult. The Translohr tramway is constructed in Zhangjiang Town which is in the heartland area of Pudong New Area (east shore of Huangpu River). Due to Economic-Technological Development Area ordinances, sound pollution must be kept to a minimum in this area. Traditional steel-wheeled trams generate much vibration and sound during their journey. Rubber tires on the trams reduce vibration, and as a result noise, substantially. Additionally, the Zhangjiang Town roads are very hilly, and rubber tired trams can more easily climb steeper grades than traditional trams. Another advantage is that rubber-tired trams don't require tracks, as steel wheeled cars do, so there is less disturbance of underground networks like power cables, phone lines, and sewer and water mains.

Timeline:
2007 – Construction of rubber tired tram started.
2009 – Test runs occurred.
2010 – Commercial services began.

Practical Info
Tickets: There is a single fare of 2 Yuan. It accepts the Shanghai Public Transport Card, the transfer discount policy for Shanghai public transport service is applicable.
Total length: 9.8 km.
Opened: December 31, 2009.
Operating hours: 5:45 am to 11 pm.
Frequency: 15 minutes (3 minutes before end of 2015).
 Operate on a "Request stop" mode. If a passenger requests a stop, a green light is illuminated and the doors open at the next stop. If no stop is requested, the doors remain closed.
 The existing traffic light system in the area (24 intersections with traffic lights) was transformed into a tram signal priority system. (though not utilized)
 The maximum speed of the vehicles is 70km/h, but due to the lack of dedicated lanes separate from other road users, the speed is set at 40 km/h.
 Alignment: on unreserved tracks and in the middle of the road. Because of the rubber tires, it is not possible to lay track in grass, as the trams can only run on concrete or paved roads.

Stations
The modern tram runs from Zhangjiang Hi-Tech Park Station to Zhangdong Road Jinqiu Road Station. Most stops have island platforms. Most Zhangjiang tram lines run along the centre of the roads, while some stations are situated at intersections and have side platforms, while the two terminals have a central platform. Trams are stored in an indoor facility at the eastern end of the line in Heqing Town.

Technology

Rolling Stock
The rolling stock is Translohr. It consists of 9 multiple units (price of 30 million yuan each) of three cars each. They are low floor, fully air conditioned, and can operate at high speeds up to 70 km/h. Each train is generally composed of 3 cars, 25 meters long and 2.2 meters wide. It can take more than 160 people, and a train can be increased to 5 cars according to demand. After the opening, there were 12 cars on the whole line, every 6 minutes or so.

See also

 Trams in Shanghai – first generation tram network
 Songjiang Tram - steel wheel tram in Shanghai
 List of rubber-tyred tram systems
 Guided bus
 Trolleybuses in Shanghai
 List of tram and light rail transit systems

References

External links 
 Video clips of Zhangjiang trams

Transport in Shanghai
Tram transport in China
Pudong